Dr. Jyoti Kiran Shukla is public figure. |

An academic, economist, scholar and author she was the first ever woman  to be the chairperson of Rajasthan's Fifth State Finance Commission. Later she was an independent director with various corporate and PSUs. She has written books and papers and is a columnist and runs her own podcast.She was the state spokesperson of the Bharatiya Janata Party, Rajasthan.

Positions
 Chairperson at Rajasthan State Finance Commission, June 2015 to present
 Bharatiya Janata Party, Rajasthan Spokesperson

Works
 Jyoti Kiran at Zee Jaipur Literature Festival 2018
Chief Minister Gehlot's Facebook Likes Furious
 Gehlot's men counter BJP charges of fake 'likes' on Facebook 
 BJP launches effort to contact first-time voters in Rajasthan
 Jyoti Kiran at Zee Rajasthan News Debate
Dr Jyoti Kiran on 'सीधी सट्ट' ETV Rajasthan

See also 
 Bharatiya Janata Party (BJP)
 Rashtriya Swayamsevak Sangh (RSS)

References

External links
 
 Facebook
 Twitter
 Instagram

Living people
People from Jaipur district
Bharatiya Janata Party politicians from Rajasthan
1968 births